Paul Dawson (born 1944) is a Canadian former politician. He served in the Legislative Assembly of New Brunswick from 1982 to 1987 as member of the Progressive Conservative party from the constituency of Miramichi-Newcastle.

References

1944 births
Living people